Bentfield Green is an area of common land and settlement in the village of Stansted Mountfitchet, in the civil parish of Stansted Mountfitchet, in the Uttlesford district, in the county of Essex, England.

Populated places in Essex
Stansted Mountfitchet